The horse barbel (Barbus tyberinus) is a species of ray-finned fish in the genus Barbus which is endemic to Italy.

References 

 

T
Endemic fauna of Italy
Fish described in 1839
Taxa named by Charles Lucien Bonaparte